Aldridge railway station is a disused station on the Midland Railway in England. It was opened in 1879 and closed in 1965, although the track through the station is still in use for freight.

History

Opened by the Midland Railway in 1879, Aldridge railway station became part of the London, Midland and Scottish Railway during the Grouping of 1923. The line then passed on to the London Midland Region of British Railways on nationalisation in 1948. The station was closed by the British Railways Board in 1965 as part of the Beeching cuts and subsequently demolished.

In 2009, the Association of Train Operating Companies included the station in a list of proposed station re-openings.

In February 2021 it was announced that land had been purchased in Aldridge near the site of its former railway station as part of plans led by Mayor of the West Midlands Andy Street and Aldridge-Brownhills MP Wendy Morton to reopen at least part of the Sutton Park line. In June 2022 it was announced that Transport for West Midlands had received £150,000 from the government's Restoring Your Railway program which will fund a business case into reopening the station and electrifying the line. At this time, it was stated that the single platform station could open in 2027.

The Site Today

Freight trains still pass the site on the Sutton Park Line.

References

External links 

Rail Around Birmingham and the West Midlands: Aldridge railway station
Aldridge Web

Station on navigable O.S. map

Disused railway stations in Walsall
Railway stations in Great Britain opened in 1879
Railway stations in Great Britain closed in 1965
Beeching closures in England
Former Midland Railway stations